Henry Rogers may refer to:

Henry Darwin Rogers (1808–1866), American geologist
Henry Huttleston Rogers (1840–1909), American leader of Standard Oil; philanthropist
Henry Wade Rogers (1853–1926), American law dean and federal judge
Henry James Rogers, paper industry executive and owner of the world's first electric house Hearthstone Historic House Museum
Henry Rogers (priest) (1583/4–1658), priest from Herefordshire, England
Henry Rogers (congregationalist) (1806–1877), English nonconformist minister and man of letters, known as a Christian apologist 
Henry Rogers (drummer) (born 1991), English drummer
Henry C. Rogers (1914–1995), American publicist
Henry Rogers (cricketer) (1840–1915), English cricketer and officer in the Indian Civil Service
Henry Warren Rogers (1831–1915), American architect

See also
Harry Rogers (disambiguation)